Daqiao is a town of Ruyuan Yao Autonomous County in northern Guangdong province, China, located about  northwest of downtown Shaoguan and  northwest of the county seat. G4 Beijing–Hong Kong and Macau Expressway runs along a ridge just to the west of the town. , it has one residential community and 21 villages under its administration.

See also 
 List of township-level divisions of Guangdong

References 

Divisions of Ruyuan Yao Autonomous County
Towns in Guangdong